Schistocyttara is a genus of moths of the family Yponomeutidae.

Species
Schistocyttara nebulosa - Turner, 1941 

Yponomeutidae